Upper Hill may refer to:

 Upper Hill, Nairobi
 Upper Hill (Pittsburgh)